The Slana River, also known as Slahna, Slakna, or Sla River, is a  tributary of the Copper River in southern Alaska in the United States. It begins near Mount Kimball in the Alaska Range and flows generally south to meet the larger river near Slana.

Its Native American name was first recorded in 1885 by Henry Tureman Allen.

Tributaries of the Slana River include the Athell Creek, Rufus Creek, Porcupine Creek, Natat Creek, Suslota Creek, Carlson Creek, Suslotina Creek, Slana Slough, Mabel Creek, Granite Creek, Jack Creek, and Alteration Creek.

The first miles of the river are through a narrow valley, but nearer to the mouth it becomes wider and meanders a lot. Between Slana River and Little Tok River lies Mentasta Lake and the Mentasta Pass. Other passes near the Slana are Gillett Pass towards the Dry Tok River, and Sikonsina Pass, towards Burnt Lake and the Big Tok River.

See also
List of rivers of Alaska

References

Rivers of Alaska
Rivers of Copper River Census Area, Alaska
Rivers of Southeast Fairbanks Census Area, Alaska
Rivers of Unorganized Borough, Alaska